Stir-fried tomato and scrambled eggs is a common dish in China. It is usually served as a main course. Because of the simplicity of preparation, it is popular in student canteens.

Shakshouka (Arabic: شكشوكة) is a very similar dish eaten in the Levant of the Middle East. The dish is also considered a main dish in various parts in the Arab world.

A version of this dish, called ginisang kamatis at itlog, is also eaten in the Philippines, usually during breakfast, and paired with garlic fried rice, or sandwiched between sliced pandesal.

History
Scrambled eggs have been eaten in China for thousands of years, but cooking them with tomatoes is a result of mixing Chinese and Western cuisine. Western restaurants using tomatoes in their cuisine began to appear in China during the late Qing Dynasty and early Republican era which influenced Chinese people to experiment with putting tomatoes into their dishes. This was particularly prominent around Shanghai, which was the most cosmopolitan Chinese city at the time. In the 1920s and 1930s, stir-fried tomato and scrambled eggs was sold at restaurants. It was around the 1940s that records of the home-cooked style stir-fried tomato and scrambled egg dish emerged.

Preparation

The eggs are scrambled. The tomatoes are wedged. In the recipe of Francis Lam of The New York Times, the eggs are cooked, then set aside. Then the tomatoes are cooked, and then the eggs are then placed back into the heat together with the tomatoes. The eggs and tomatoes are stirred together until well combined and done.

Alternatively, the tomatoes are fried first for approximately a minute and salted. The eggs are added last, and the dish is cooked until done to taste.

See also

 List of egg dishes
 List of tomato dishes
 Omelette

References

Further reading

External links
 
  (recipe)

Egg dishes
Chinese cuisine
Tomato dishes
Food combinations